The 1892 Wisconsin Badgers football team represented the University of Wisconsin as a member of the Intercollegiate Athletic Association of the Northwest (IAANW) during the 1892 college football season. Led by Frank Crawford in his first and only season as head coach, the Badgers compiled an overall record of 4–3 with a mark of 2–2 in conference playing, placing second in the IAANW. The team's captain was John D. Freeman.

Schedule

References

Wisconsin
Wisconsin Badgers football seasons
Wisconsin Badgers football